Mengban Township is a township in Jinggu Dai and Yi Autonomous County, Yunnan, China.

Administrative division
As of 2016, the town is divided into eight villages: 
Mengban
Taiping
Anle
Baluo
Qiangang
Manghai
Jinli
Yanjiao

Geography
The township is situated at southwestern Jinggu Dai and Yi Autonomous County. The township shares a border with Banpo Township and Qianliu Yi Ethnic Township to the west, Yongping Town to the north, and Bi'an Township to the east and south.

The Lama Stream and Mogan Stream, both are tributaries of Lancang River, flow through the township.

Economy
The main industries in and around the township are forestry and farming. Economic crops are mainly tea, sugarcane, and flax. The region also has an abundance of copper and zinc.

Demographics

As of 2020, the National Bureau of Statistics of China estimates the township's population now to be 24,400.

References

Bibliography

Divisions of Jinggu Dai and Yi Autonomous County